Alveolar R may refer to several types of alveolar consonant:

Alveolar trill
Alveolar approximant
Alveolar tap or flap
Pronunciation of English /r/